SS Pontic was a tender and baggage vessel of the White Star Line that was built in 1894 by Harland & Wolff Ltd, Belfast, United Kingdom. She was sold in 1919 and continued in that role. In 1925, she was sold and used as a collier. She was scrapped in 1930.

Description
The engine was built by Harland & Wolff.

History
The ship was launched on 3 February 1894 from the Harland and Wolff shipyard in Belfast. She was delivered on 13 April that year. The United Kingdom Official Number 102143 and Code Letters NJFK were allocated. Her port of registry was Liverpool, Lancashire.

On 9 October 1919, Pontic was sold to Rea Towing Co Ltd, Liverpool. She continued in use as a tender. On 23 January 1925, Pontic was sold to John Donaldson's Beardmore Steam Ship Co Ltd. She was placed under the management of Beardmore Donaldson Coal Trimmers Ltd and used as a collier and sand carrier. Pontic was scrapped at a Clyde shipbreakers in 1930.

See also
, another White Star Line tender.

Notes

1894 ships
Ships built in Belfast
Merchant ships of the United Kingdom
Steamships of the United Kingdom
World War I merchant ships of the United Kingdom
Ships built by Harland and Wolff